The Independent Presbyterian Church of Savannah, on Bull Street in Savannah, Georgia, is the first Presbyterian church in Georgia, founded in 1755. Land for its first building was deeded by King George II of Great Britain for use by colonial adherents of the Church of Scotland. The first building burned down in 1796, and another modeled after St. Martin in the Fields was built in 1800. This building burned down in 1889 and a reproduction was completed in 1891.

The current minister is Terry Johnson, who is a minister in the Presbyterian Church in America.

It is included in the Savannah Historic District

References

Further reading

External links
 Official website
Stuart A. Rose Manuscript, Archives, and Rare Book Library, Emory University: Independent Presbyterian Church (Savannah, Ga.) records, 1800-1960

Presbyterian churches in Georgia (U.S. state)
Churches in Savannah, Georgia
Chippewa Square buildings
Savannah Historic District